Patrick Mary O'Donnell (1897–1980) was an Irish-born Roman Catholic priest in Australia. He was Roman Catholic Archbishop of Brisbane in Queensland.

Early life
Patrick O'Donnell was born on 2 February 1897 at Main Street, Fethard, Ireland, the son of Thomas and Johanna O'Donnell, who had a drapery business.

Religious service
Patrick O'Donnell was ordained as the priest of Sale in Victoria, Australia, on 15 April 1922.

On 8 November 1948 O'Donnell was appointed the coadjutor archbishop of the Roman Catholic Archdiocese of Brisbane with the right of succession. He served as coadjutor to Archbishop James Duhig for 16 years until Duhig's death on 10 April 1965, whereupon he succeeded him as Archbishop of Brisbane.

Later life
Patrick O'Donnell retired on 5 March 1973, as the Second Vatican Council had decided that bishops and archbishops should retire at 75 years of age. He installed his successor Francis Roberts Rush in a ceremony on 30 May 1973.

He lived quietly at his home Glengariff in Hendra in Brisbane until his death on 2 November 1980. He was buried in Cathedral of St Stephen, Brisbane beside Archbishop Duhig.

References

Roman Catholic archbishops of Brisbane
1897 births
1980 deaths
20th-century Roman Catholic archbishops in Australia
Irish expatriate archbishops